The Museum of Archaeology is a history museum in Southern Taiwan Science Park, Sinshih District, Tainan, Taiwan. The museum is the branch of National Museum of Prehistory.

History
The soft opening of the museum was done on 26 December 2018. The ceremony was attended by Vice Culture Minister Lee Lien-chuan and a group of Siraya people. It was constructed with a cost of NT$1.5 billion. The museum was officially opened on 19 October 2019.

Architecture
The museum spans over an area of 24,000 m2. It was designed by architect Kris Yao.

Exhibitions
The museum displays artifacts of Taiwan's prehistory culture, as well as those found during the construction of Southern Taiwan Science Park.

Transportation
The museum is accessible within walking distance west of Nanke Station of Taiwan Railways.

See also
 List of museums in Taiwan

References

External links

 

2018 establishments in Taiwan
Archaeological museums in Taiwan
Museums established in 2018
Museums in Tainan